Baron Donaldson could refer to:

John George Stuart Donaldson, Baron Donaldson of Kingsbridge (1907–1998)
John Donaldson, Baron Donaldson of Lymington (1920–2005)